The Commercial Bank of Ethiopia (CBE) is the largest commercial bank in Ethiopia. As of June 2021, it had about 1.1 trillion birr in assets and held approximately 67% of deposits and about 53% of all bank loans in the country. The bank has around 22,908 employees, who staff its headquarters and its over 1000+ branches positioned in the main cities and regional towns. The latter include 120 branches in the national capital Addis Ababa. With the opening of a branch in the Gechi in the Illubabor Zone, CBE's banking network has reached online 783 branches. The bank has reached 1284 branches as of 10 August 2018.

The bank also operates two branches in South Sudan. It is contemplating re-opening a branch in Djibouti, and opening branches in Dubai and Washington, DC, all to serve the Ethiopian diaspora.

The bank is pioneer to introduce modern banking to Ethiopia and credited for playing a catalytic role in the economic progress and development of the country. It is also the first bank in Ethiopia to introduce ATM service for local users.

History
After the Ethiopian victory over Italy during World War II, the new government issued a proclamation on 26 August 1942 that established the State Bank of Ethiopia (SBE). SBE commenced full operations on 15 April 1943 with two branches and 43 staff. It served both as Ethiopia's central bank, with the power to issue banknotes and coins as the agent of the Ministry of Finance, and as the principal commercial bank in the country. In 1945 the Ethiopian government granted the bank the sole right of issuing currency. The first governor of the bank was an American, George Blowers. He inaugurated the new national currency, which owed its successful introduction to the United States. The United States provided the silver for 50-cent coins, whose intrinsic value ensured popular acceptance of the new paper money to a population used to the circulation of the silver Maria Theresa thaler. In 1958, the State Bank of Ethiopia established a branch in Khartoum, Sudan. Over time SBD's branch network grew to number 21 branches.

In the 1950s, SBE established a branch in Djibouti. In 1920 the Bank of Abyssinia had opened a transit office in Djibouti. At some point after the creation of the State Bank of Ethiopia it reopened the transit office, which in time became a branch.

In 1963, the Ethiopian government split the State Bank of Ethiopia into two banks, the National Bank of Ethiopia (the central bank), and the Commercial Bank of Ethiopia (CBE). Seven years later, the Sudanese government nationalized the Commercial Bank of Ethiopia's branch in Khartoum that had originally been the Sudan branch of SBD.

The Ethiopian government merged Addis Bank into the Commercial Bank of Ethiopia in 1980 to make CBE the sole commercial bank in the country. The government had created Addis Bank from the merger of the newly nationalized Addis Ababa Bank, and the Ethiopian operations of the Banco di Roma and Banco di Napoli. Addis Ababa Bank was an affiliate that National and Grindlays Bank had established in 1963 and of which it owned 40%. At the time of nationalization, Addis Ababa Bank had 26 branches. The merger of Addis Ababa Bank with CBE made CBE the sole commercial bank in Ethiopia, with 128 branches and 3,633 employees.

In 1991, when Eritrea achieved its independence, the Eritrean government nationalized the branches there. In 1994 these branches formed the basis for what became the Commercial Bank of Eritrea. Also in 1994, the Ethiopian government reorganized and reestablished CBE.

In 2004, CBE closed its branch in Djibouti due to problems with loan losses.

In January 2009, CBE received regulatory approval to open a branch in Juba, Southern Sudan. CBE expanded its presence in South Sudan to five branches in Juba and Malakal, but ongoing conflict in the country has forced CBE to close all but two branches in Juba.

A few years ago, the government restructured CBE and signed a contract with Royal Bank of Scotland for management consultancy services. After the death of its former President Gezahegn Yilma, the Board of Management appointed Abie Sano as a new President of the Bank.  The Parliament recently increased the bank's capital to 4 billion Ethiopian birr. The bank has reached 1284 branches as of 10 August 2018.

See also 

 List of banks in Ethiopia

References

External links
Official Website

Banks of Ethiopia
Banks established in 1963
Buildings and structures in Addis Ababa
Companies based in Addis Ababa
1963 establishments in Ethiopia
Government-owned companies of Ethiopia
20th-century architecture in Ethiopia